"The Chain" is a song by British-American rock band Fleetwood Mac, released on their 1977 album Rumours. It is the only song from the album with writing credits for all five members (Stevie Nicks, Lindsey Buckingham, Christine McVie, John McVie, and Mick Fleetwood).

"The Chain" was created from combinations of several previously rejected materials, including solo work by Lindsey Buckingham, Stevie Nicks, and Christine McVie. The song was assembled, often manually by splicing tapes with a razor blade, at the Record Plant in Sausalito, California, with engineers Ken Caillat and Richard Dashut. 

Following the critical and commercial success of Rumours, "The Chain" has become a staple of the band's live shows, typically the opening song. It was featured as the opening track on The Dance, a 1997 live concert CD/DVD release, as well as several of the band's greatest hits compilations. The song has attained particular fame in the United Kingdom, where the instrumental section has been used as the theme tune for the BBC and Channel 4's television coverage of Formula One.

Background
According to interviews on the writing of Rumours, the final section of "The Chain"—beginning with a bass progression—was created by John McVie and Mick Fleetwood. Stevie Nicks had written the lyrics separately and thought they would be a good match; she and Christine McVie did some reworking to create the first section of the tune. Nicks' lyrics referenced the breakup of her relationship with Buckingham, a theme of many of Nicks' and Buckingham's lyrics on Rumours. Other elements were worked in from an early project of Christine's called "Keep Me There", which removed the blues-style motif, but retained the chord progression. To complete the song, Buckingham recycled the intro from an earlier song from a duet with Nicks, "Lola (My Love)", originally released on their self-titled 1973 album.

Due to the spliced nature of the record (the drums and guitar were the only instruments recorded in each other's company) and its sporadic composition and assembly from different rejected songs, "The Chain" is one of only a few Fleetwood Mac songs whose authorship is credited to all members of the band at the time. The finished song has a basic rock structure, although it has two distinct portions: the main verse and chorus, and the outro. Influences of hard rock, folk, and country are also present. The Dobro, a type of resonator guitar, supplies the verse riff. The song is in E minor, which is the relative minor key of G major. The vocal range is G3 to C5.

Release and reception
Rumours garnered widespread critical acclaim upon its release. Subsequent analysis of "The Chain" has also led many to cite it as one of the most evocative expressions of the internal fracture among various band members at the time. Buckingham and Nicks were ending their years-long relationship at the same time that John and Christine McVie's marriage broke down, as did that of Fleetwood and his wife, Jenny Boyd.

In 1997, Fleetwood Mac released a live concert CD/DVD package called The Dance, which featured the reunion of the Rumours-era Fleetwood Mac members. The rendition of "The Chain" reached number 30 on the Billboard Mainstream Rock Tracks chart. Additionally, the studio version began appearing on the charts in 2009, where it debuted at number 94 in the UK. Two years later, the song peaked at number 81. In March 2022, the song was certified triple platinum by the British Phonographic Industry (BPI) for sales and streams of over 1,800,000 units.

Personnel
Lindsey Buckingham – electric guitars • Dobro • lead vocals
Stevie Nicks – lead and harmony vocals • tambourine (only in live versions)
Christine McVie – Harmonium • Hammond organ • harmony vocals
John McVie – fretless bass guitar
Mick Fleetwood – drums • tambourine

Charts

The Dance version

Original version

Weekly charts

Year-end charts

Certifications and sales

Other media

The BBC's Formula One coverage used the ending bass line as a theme tune from 1978 until 1996 and again from 2009 to 2015, thus making the song highly recognisable in the United Kingdom. On 29 March 2009, the song re-entered the UK Chart at number 94 through downloads, following confirmation from the BBC that it would be reintroduced, the BBC having regained broadcasting rights from ITV. On 20 March 2011, "The Chain" peaked higher at number 81 in the UK chart following a campaign on Facebook to try to get the song to number 1 for the start of the 2011 Formula One season.

Guardians of the Galaxy Vol. 2 director James Gunn has said that "The Chain" was "most deeply embedded into the fibers of the film". "The Chain" was also used as the closing song to the first season episode "We Gull Way Back" of the HBO Max series Our Flag Means Death.

Tantric cover

The song was recorded by the American rock band Tantric, released as the second single from their 2004 second album, After We Go. However, even though the song was released as a single, it lacked much promotion, and debuted at number 36 on the US Mainstream Rock chart.

Tantric's cover of the song was used as the theme song for the 2004 HBO Documentary series Family Bonds.

Three Days Grace cover

The song was recorded by the Canadian rock band Three Days Grace, released from their EP, Lost in You. It was released on March 15, 2011. The song peaked at number 45 on the Rock Digital Song Sales chart.

Charts

Evanescence cover

American rock band Evanescence released a cover version of the song. The song was released as a digital download on 22 November 2019 by BMG.

Background
Amy Lee, the lead vocalist of Evanescence said, "This cover was so fun to make. We love Fleetwood Mac and wanted to paint a dark and epic picture with our take on 'The Chain'. The lyrics make me feel the power of standing together against great forces trying to pull us apart, perhaps even from the inside. I really wanted to drive that home in our version, and even made everyone in the band sing by the end of it! We're beyond excited to share this with our fans and I'm really looking forward to playing it live."

Music video
An official music video to accompany the release of "The Chain" was first released onto YouTube on 9 January 2020.

Track listing

Charts

Release history

References

External links
 

1977 songs
Fleetwood Mac songs
Songs written by Christine McVie
Songs written by Mick Fleetwood
Songs written by Lindsey Buckingham
Songs written by John McVie
Songs written by Stevie Nicks
1997 singles
Song recordings produced by Ken Caillat
Song recordings produced by Richard Dashut
Live singles
Warner Records singles
Maverick Records singles
BMG Rights Management singles
Tantric (band) songs
2004 singles
Songs about heartache
Sports television theme songs